
Gmina Czyże is a rural gmina (administrative district) in Hajnówka County, Podlaskie Voivodeship, in north-eastern Poland.

It is one of five Polish/Belarusian bilingual Gmina in Podlaskie Voivodeship regulated by the Act of 6 January 2005 on National and Ethnic Minorities and on the Regional Languages, which permits certain gminas with significant linguistic minorities to introduce a second, auxiliary language to be used in official contexts alongside Polish.

Villages
Gmina Czyże contains the villages and settlements of Bujakowszczyzna, Czyże, Hrabniak, Hukowicze, Kamień, Klejniki, Kojły, Kuraszewo, Lady, Leniewo, Leszczyny, Łuszcze, Maksymowszczyzna, Morze, Osówka, Podrzeczany, Podwieżanka, Rakowicze, Sapowo, Szostakowo, Wieżanka, Wólka and Zbucz.

Neighbouring gminas
Gmina Czyże is bordered by the gminas of Bielsk Podlaski, Dubicze Cerkiewne, Hajnówka, Narew and Orla.

References

 Polish official population figures 2006

Czyze
Hajnówka County
Bilingual communes in Poland